The Seven Ages of Man is a 1975 Australian television series. It consisted of seven 30-minute episodes.

It was produced by Alan Burke.

References

External links
Seven Ages of Man at IMDb

1975 Australian television series debuts